Michael Nicholson (born 1941) is an American perpetual student from Kalamazoo, Michigan, who has received two associate's degrees, three specialist's degrees and a doctoral degree, along with 22 master's degrees, including ones in health administration and special education administration. He has been in school for 55 years. Nicholson has earned degrees from a range of institutions including in Michigan, Texas, Indiana and Canada.  His first degree was in religious education from William Tyndale College. Nicholson has worked at several teaching positions.

When asked in 2012 about his pursuit, Nicholson said "I just stayed in school and took menial jobs to pay for the education and just made a point of getting more degrees and eventually I retired so that I could go full time to school." He took on a job as a parking attendant to attain a tuition discount.

References

Students in the United States
William Tyndale College alumni
People from Kalamazoo, Michigan
Living people
American people of Canadian descent
1941 births